Drupadia niasica  is a species of butterfly belonging to the lycaenid family described by Julius Röber in 1886. It is found in  the Indomalayan realm.

Subspecies
Drupadia niasica niasica (Nias)
Drupadia niasica scudderii (Doherty, 1889) (southern Burma, Mergui)
Drupadia niasica thaenia (Druce, 1895) (Borneo)
Drupadia niasica biranta (Riley, 1942) (Langkawi)
Drupadia niasica perlisa (Riley, 1942) (Peninsular Malaysia)
Drupadia niasica karnyi (Riley, [1945]) (Siberut)
Drupadia niasica ianthina Cowan, 1974 (Batu)
Drupadia niasica ultra Cowan, 1974 (Borneo: Sarawak, S.Kalimantan, Pulau Laut)
Drupadia niasica florens Cowan, 1974 (Philippines: Mindanao)
Drupadia niasica ohtai H. Hayashi, 1984 (Indonesia: northern Sumatra)
Drupadia niasica takioi H. Hayashi, 1984 (Indonesia: Simeulue)
Drupadia niasica natinis Takanami, 1987 (Philippines: Mindoro)

References

External links
 Drupadia at Markku Savela's Lepidoptera and Some Other Life Forms

niasica
Butterflies described in 1886